Germany competed at the 2012 Summer Paralympics in London, United Kingdom, from 29 August to 9 September 2012. 150 German athletes, 88 men and 62 women, participated in London.

Medallists

Archery

Four athletes were nominated for the archery competitions.

Men

|-
|align=left|Matthias Alpers
|align=left|Ind. recurve Standing
|613
|8
|L 4–6
|colspan=5|did not advance
|-
|align=left|Maik Szarszewski
|align=left|Ind. recurve W1/W2
|589
|12
|W 6–0
|L 0–6
|colspan=4|did not advance
|}

Women

|-
|align=left|Maria Droste
|align=left|Ind. recurve W1/W2
|461
|17
|L 0–6
|colspan=5|did not advance
|-
|align=left|Katharina Schett
|align=left|Ind. recurve Standing
|497
|14
|L 5–6
|colspan=5|did not advance
|}

Athletics

Men

Women

Cycling

Road

Track
Pursuit

Equestrian

Individual

Team

* Indicates the three best individual scores that count towards the team total.

Judo

Men

Women

Powerlifting

Men

Rowing

Sailing

Shooting

Men

Women

Swimming

Men

Women

Table tennis

Men

Women

Teams

Volleyball

Germany qualified for the men's team event by winning against Ukraine at the Intercontinental Cup.

Men's tournament
Roster

Group play

Quarter-final

Semi-final

Bronze medal match

Wheelchair basketball

Competing athletes are given an eight-level-score specific to wheelchair basketball, ranging from 0.5 to 4.5 with lower scores representing a higher degree of disability. The sum score of all players on the court cannot exceed 14.

Men's tournament

Group stage

Quarter-final

5th–8th place semi-final

5th/6th place match

Women's tournament

Germany qualified for the women's team event in wheelchair basketball by finishing second at the 2010 Wheelchair Basketball World Championship.

Group stage

Quarter-final

Semi-final

Gold medal match

Wheelchair fencing

Wheelchair tennis

Women

See also
2012 Summer Paralympics
Germany at the Paralympics
Germany at the 2012 Summer Olympics

Notes

Nations at the 2012 Summer Paralympics
2012
Paralympics